Shambhavi Singh (born 1966) is a painter, printmaker, and installation artist currently based in New Delhi, India.  Her artistic practice includes a wide variety of processes and media, but her work is largely non-figurative and focuses on the relationship between man and nature, as well as the social and metaphysical condition of the agricultural worker.

Life and career 

Born in Patna, the capital of the Indian state of Bihar, Singh grew up visiting her grandparents in the countryside – visits that she cites as the origin of her fascination with nature and the inspiration for much of her work. Singh attended the College of Fine Arts and Crafts, Patna in the 1980s, alongside her contemporary, Subodh Gupta. She moved to New Delhi in 1990, earning a Masters in Fine Arts from Delhi College of Art, and she has continued to live and work in the capital for the majority of her two-decade career, despite frequent travel. In 1997, Singh traveled to the Netherlands to participate in a project at the Tropenmuseum in Amsterdam, where she began to take interest in issues of migration and migrant labor. In 2000-2001, she was an artist-in-residence at Greatmore Studios, in Cape Town, South Africa, which led not only to a deepened engagement with the philosophy of Mahatma Gandhi, but also to an invitation to participate in Holland South Africa Line (HSAL), an international exchange project with Dutch artists held in the William Fehr Collection, in the Castle of Good Hope. In 2010, Singh was invited to be an   artist-in-residence at STPI - Creative Workshop & Gallery, in Singapore.

Work 

Despite her extensive international travel, Singh continues to ground her work in her upbringing in Bihar, which she said "nurtured and evolved [her] creative language." Her experiences abroad, in fact, helped to clarify her existing interest in the relationship between nature and man – it was while traveling, for example, that she began to become aware of the history of migration, as well as the plight of migrant laborers. Although Singh, who has worked in paint, printmaking, sculpture, video installation, and other new media, uses largely non-figurative and non-narrative modes of expression, her work remains closely engaged with the life and struggles of the agricultural worker. Singh's work has been exhibited in India, South Africa, Australia, New York, and The Netherlands, where she was associated with the Foundation of Indian Artists, Amsterdam. She is represented by Talwar Gallery, which has exhibited her work in New York and New Delhi. Recently, Singh's work was added to the collection of the Museum of Modern Art (MoMA), in New York. Additionally, Shambhavi works was displayed in a solo exhibition named Bhoomi through January 25- February 24 in the year of 2020 in Gallery Escape, located in New Delhi, India. Bhoomi reflects Singh's continuing dialogue with the countryside, the farmer, their instruments, surfaces, and trends underlying environment which unite or which structure has become a representation in both recollection and identification.

Selected exhibitions

Solo exhibitions 

 2020: Gallery Escape, Bhoomi, New Delhi, India 

2014: Talwar Gallery, Reaper's Melody, New Delhi, India
2011: Talwar Gallery, Lonely Furrow, New York, NY, US

Singapore Tyler Print Institute, Lonely Furrow, Singapore

2008: Talwar Gallery, Lullaby, New Delhi, India
2007:  Talwar Gallery, A Bird and 2000 echoes: paintings 2001-2006
2002: Vadehra Art Gallery, New Delhi, India
1998: Association for Visual Arts (AVA), Passage from India, Cape Town, South Africa

Kwazulu Natal Society Art Gallery (NSA), Curated by Mirjam Asmal, Durban, South Africa

1997: Foundation for Indian Artists (FIA), Earth and Sky, Amsterdam, The Netherlands
1995: Foundation for Indian Artists (FIA), Birds eyes, Amsterdam, The Netherlands
1994:  Gallery Chemould, Vigourous, Mumbai, India
1992-93:  Foundation for Indian Artists (FIA), Passion for Home, Amsterdam, The Netherlands

The Gallery, Madras, India

1990: Shridharapi Gallery, Dawn, New Delhi, India
1989: Jehangir Art Gallery, Mumbai, India

Selected group exhibitions 
 2005: Vadehra Art Gallery, We are like this only, New Delhi, India
 2004: Indira Gandhi National Centre for the Arts, Amrita Shergil Revisited, New Delhi, India
 2003: Lalit Kala Academy, Unshackled Spirit, New Delhi, India

Residencies & Workshops 

2010: STPI - Creative Workshop & Gallery
2001-2004: Greatmore Studios, Cape Town, South Africa, with participation in Holland South Africa Line (HSAL), at The Castle of Good Hope, William Fehr Collection
2002: KHOJ International Workshop, Mysore and Bangalore, India
1998-99: The search within, Art between Implosion and Explosion, Pernegg Monastery, Vienna
1997: Project on "Kali," Tropenmuseum, Amsterdam, The Netherlands

References

External links 
 Artforum, Shambhavi Singh, March 2015.
 Art India, Perhaps the Plaintive Numbers Flow, January 2015.
 Talwar Gallery, Lullaby, exhibition catalogue.
 Singapore Tyler Print Institute, Lonely Furrow, exhibition catalogue.
 The Indian Express, Taking Seed at MoMA, May 2012.
 Tehelka, The Dark Horse at MoMA, March 2012.
 The Hindu, When art and nature intersect, November 2011.
 Livemint, The Cosmos in a Pot: Artist Shambhavi Singh Explores Her Inspirations, May 2008.

1966 births
Living people
Indian women painters
Indian printmakers
Artists from Patna
20th-century Indian painters
20th-century printmakers
20th-century Indian women artists
Women artists from Bihar
Indian installation artists
Painters from Bihar
21st-century Indian women artists